Ira Lee Sorkin (born May 30, 1943) is an American attorney.  He is best known for representing Bernard Madoff, the American businessman who pleaded guilty to perpetrating the largest investor fraud ever committed by a single person.

Education and career
Sorkin grew up in Manhasset, NY, and graduated from Manhasset High School in 1961. He was president of his senior class, starting center on the football team, and the star shot-put of the track and field team. He received his B.A. from Tulane University in 1965 and his J.D. from The George Washington University Law School in 1968.

Sorkin began his legal career as a summer intern in the office of the District Attorney for Brooklyn, New York, in 1966 followed by a second summer internship in the United States Attorney's office in Manhattan in 1967. When he graduated law school, his first job was as a trial attorney in New York with the U.S. Securities and Exchange Commission. Thereafter, Mr. Sorkin served as an Assistant U.S. Attorney and then Deputy Chief of the Criminal Division of the U.S. Attorney's Office for the Southern District of New York in the 1970s. From 1984 to 1986 he worked as the Director of the SEC's New York office. In 1995 and 1996, he also served as the Chief Legal Officer of Nomura Securities, a member firm of the New York Stock Exchange. In 1997, he became a defense attorney.

While in the United States Attorney's Office:

I tried 15 cases in 11 months. ... In those days, we tried everything — stolen mail cases, food stamp cases. These days, if you're prosecutor for five years, you might get to try five cases.

One of his first private clients was Rupert Murdoch in the law firm of Howard Squadron, Theodore Ellenoff and Stanley Plesent. When the firm merged, he joined as a partner at Carter Ledyard & Milburn. Thereafter in 2004, Mr. Sorkin joined the New York Office of Dickstein Shapiro, a large American law firm.[1] On November 8, 2010, Mr. Sorkin left Dickstein Shapiro along with four other lawyers to join New Jersey-based law firm Lowenstein Sandler as a partner.

Among many clients in his career, Sorkin represented Stratton Oakmont and Jordan Belfort ("Wolf of Wall Street"). Between 1991 and 1996, Sorkin defended Monzer al-Kassar, a Syrian convicted in November 2008 of supplying arms to undercover agents posing as anti-American terrorists.[2] Thereafter, he represented Bernard Madoff.

Sorkin is currently a partner at Mintz & Gold LLP, a full-service New York City-based law firm. Sorkin was a partner at Lowenstein Sandler and left to form his own law firm, Sorkin & Sondhi LLP, with his legal partner, Amit Sondhi. On November 3, 2015, Sorkin merged  his firm, Sorkin & Sondhi LLP, with Mintz & Gold LLP.

Bernard Madoff
Howard Squadron and several other partners invested with Bernard Madoff, and the firm's pension account, including about $19,000 belonging to Sorkin.  Sorkin's parents have had about $900,000 invested with Madoff in more than one account; these were liquidated following the mother's death in 2007, long before the fraud became known, with the proceeds distributed to Sorkin's two grown sons.

Sorkin is the lead defense attorney on the Madoff fraud case, assisted by associates Daniel J. Horwitz, Nicole P. De Bello and Mauro M. Wolfe, who had changed firms along with him when he joined Dickstein Shapiro.  On March 20, 2009, an appellate court denied his request to release Madoff from incarceration, to "penthouse arrest" pending his June 2009 scheduled sentencing date.

SEC v. Avellino and Bienes
In November 1992, Sorkin represented two accountants, Frank J. Avellino and Michael S. Bienes of Fort Lauderdale.   Bienes began his career working as an accountant for Madoff's father-in-law, Saul Alpern. Then, he became a partner in the accounting firm Alpern, Avellino and Bienes. In 1962, the firm began advising its clients about investing all of their money with a mystery man, a highly successful and controversial figure on Wall Street, but until this episode, not known as an ace money manager, (Madoff). When Alpern retired at the end of 1974, the firm became Avellino and Bienes and continued to invest solely with Madoff.

Avellino & Bienes were accused of selling unregistered securities, and in its report, the SEC mentioned the fund's "curiously steady" yearly returns to investors of 13.5% to 20%.  However, the SEC did not look any more deeply into the matter, and never publicly disclosed Madoff.  Through Sorkin, who once oversaw the SEC's New York office, Avellino & Bienes agreed to return the money to investors, shut down their firm, undergo an audit, and pay a fine of $350,000.  Avellino complained to the presiding Federal Judge, John E. Sprizzo, that Price Waterhouse fees were excessive, but the judge ordered him to pay the bill of $428,679 in full.  Madoff said that he did not realize the feeder fund was operating illegally, and that his own investment returns tracked the previous 10 years of the S&P 500.  The SEC investigation came right in the middle of Madoff's three terms as the powerful chairman of the NASDAQ stock market board.

The size of the pools mushroomed by word-of-mouth, and investors grew to 3,200 in nine accounts with Madoff.   Regulators feared it all might be just a huge scam. "We went into this thinking it could be a major catastrophe. They took in nearly a half a billion dollars in investor money, totally outside the system that we can monitor and regulate. That's pretty frightening." said Richard Walker, at the time, the SEC's New York regional administrator.
  The case number is: SEC v. Avellino & Bienes et al., Lit. Rel. No. 13443 (Nov. 27, 1992).

Bienes, 72, recently discussed that he deposited $454 million of investors' money with Madoff, and until 2007, continued to invest several million dollars of his own money. "Doubt Bernie Madoff? Doubt Bernie? No. You doubt God. You can doubt God, but you don't doubt Bernie. He had that aura about him."  His $6.7 million home in the exclusive Bay Colony of Ft. Lauderdale is presently for sale.

SEC v. Telfran Ltd.
Sorkin also represented accountants, Steven Mendelow of New York City and Edward Glantz of Lake Worth, Fla., who in 1989 began their own pool, Telfran Ltd., investing in Avellino & Bienes, and sold $89.6 million in unregistered notes.  They were charged in a separate SEC civil lawsuit alleging that Telfran made money by investing in Avellino & Bienes notes paying 15% to 19% annually, while paying Telfran investors lower rates.  All funds were ordered by the SEC to be returned to the investors.  The case is: Civil Action No. 92·8564, SDNY (LR·13463)

Mr. Mendelow has also been subpoenaed in the present Madoff Scandal and is cooperating, according to his lawyer, who said he engaged in no wrongdoing. "I don't think he has done anything to promote Mr. Madoff since the 1992, 1993 decree," said Stanley S. Arkin, Mendelow's lawyer. One of the lawyers of the firm was giving information to the reporter of Fox Business during the Court process. Under the says of the New York Bar it was not very ethical.

Philanthropy
Sorkin is fund-raising chairman of American Friends of the Hebrew University.  Through ads and testimonials, he helps to promote tourism to Israel.

References

American lawyers
1943 births
Living people
Jewish American attorneys
People associated with the Madoff investment scandal
People from Manhasset, New York
1940s births
Tulane University alumni
George Washington University Law School alumni
Manhasset High School alumni